The California Coastal National Monument is located along the entire coastline of  the U.S. state of California. Conservative estimates are for at least 20,000 such outcroppings. The monument was created by Bill Clinton via Presidential proclamation on January 11, 2000, with the authority in section two of the Antiquities Act of 1906. The U.S. Bureau of Land Management, an agency of the U.S. Department of the Interior that manages the monument, has developed gateways in cooperation with other agencies along the California coast to introduce the monument to the public. These include the Trinidad, Point Arena, Fort Bragg-Mendocino, Pigeon Point Lighthouse, Piedras Blancas State Marine Reserve and Marine Conservation Area, and the Palos Verdes Peninsula. Although being the most-viewed national monument in California, people are usually unaware that the entire coastline is a national monument.

Expansion
The monument has seen two major expansions since its creation:

Point Arena-Stornetta Public Lands
On March 11, 2014, President Barack Obama used a presidential proclamation to add the Point Arena-Stornetta Public Lands to the monument. The proclamation added  of onshore areas to the existing monument, comprising the estuary of the Garcia River. The Point Arena-Stornetta Public Lands is located on the Mendocino County Coast, north of the small town of Point Arena. Point Arena-Stornetta Public Lands will receive full federal protection and will be open to the public. The Point Arena-Stornetta Public Land was the first onshore segment of the national monument that visitors were allowed on. Under federal protection, the public is allowed to use the land for bird watching, fishing, picnicking, nature photography, and wildlife observation. Overnight camping and parking is prohibited. Along the coastal area there are numerous sinkholes and unsteady cliffs. A bill adding this area passed the US House in 2013.

California Coastal National Monument Expansion Act

It also would include some small rocks and islands off the coast of Orange County. In January 2017, President Obama used his executive power under the 1906 Antiquities Act to designate these sites as National Monuments.

Onshore units 
Six onshore units comprise  of public land: Trinidad Head, Waluplh-Lighthouse Ranch, Lost Coast Headlands, Point Arena-Stornetta, Cotoni-Coast Dairies, and Piedras Blancas.

Cotoni-Coast Dairies Unit 

For most of the 20th century, Coast Dairies was run as a farm and ranching operation by the descendents of two Swiss families. After it was purchased by Save the Redwoods League in 1998, it was transferred to Trust for Public Land. Most of the rest of the land has been transferred to the Bureau of Land Management.

In 2014, the Bureau of Land Management bought a  tract of land on the inland side of the highway adjacent to the coastal parcels. President Barack Obama designated Cotoni-Coast Dairies as a National Monument in 2017. The Bureau of Land Management developed a management that was approved by the California Coastal Commission in 2020. Some of the land east of the highway will continue to be used for farming, but most will become open to the public.

See also
California Coastal Commission
California Coastal Trail
List of national monuments of the United States

References

External links

 
 
 POINT ARENA STORNETTA UNIT, includes trail map, at Mendocino Land Trust

National Monuments in California
Marine sanctuaries in California
Bureau of Land Management National Monuments
Bureau of Land Management areas in California
Parks in Southern California
Protected areas of Southern California
2000 establishments in California
Protected areas established in 2000
West Coast of the United States
Units of the National Landscape Conservation System